The 2017–18 Jacksonville Dolphins men's basketball team represented Jacksonville University during the 2017–18 NCAA Division I men's basketball season. The Dolphins, led by fourth-year head coach Tony Jasick played their home games at Swisher Gymnasium on the university's Jacksonville, Florida campus as members of the Atlantic Sun Conference. They finished the season 15–18, 8–6 in ASUN play to finish in third place. They defeated Kennesaw State in the quarterfinals of the ASUN tournament before losing in the semifinals to Lipscomb.

Previous season
The Dolphins finished the 2016–17 season 17–16, 5–9 in ASUN play to finish in sixth place. They lost in the quarterfinals of the ASUN tournament to North Florida. They were invited to the CollegeInsider.com Tournament where they lost in the first round to Saint Francis (PA).

Offseason

Departures

Incoming transfers

2017 recruiting class

Roster

Schedule and results
 
|-
!colspan=9 style=| Exhibition

|-
!colspan=9 style=| Non-conference regular season

|-
!colspan=9 style=| Atlantic Sun Conference regular season

|-
!colspan=9 style=| Atlantic Sun tournament

Source

References

Jacksonville Dolphins men's basketball seasons
Jacksonville